Scorton Hill is a mountain in Barnstable County, Massachusetts. White Hill is located northeast of Scorton Hill.

References

Mountains of Massachusetts
Mountains of Barnstable County, Massachusetts